Wesley Earl Short Jr. (born December 4, 1963) is an American professional golfer who has played on the PGA Tour, Nationwide Tour, and PGA Tour Champions.

Short was born, raised and has lived his entire life in Austin, Texas. He attended the University of Texas. He is married to Gail Elizabeth Hardy. They have one daughter together, Elizabeth Ann Short.

Short became a professional golfer in 1987. He worked as a club pro in the Austin area before becoming a touring pro in 1997. He started out on the mini-tours and eventually qualified for the Nationwide Tour for the 1998 season. He was a member of the Nationwide Tour again in 2002–03. His best finish on the Nationwide Tour was a T-2 at The Reese's Cup Classic in 2003.

Short finally earned the opportunity to play on the PGA Tour in 2004 as a 40-year-old rookie. His only PGA Tour win came in 2005 at the Michelin Championship at Las Vegas, when he defeated Jim Furyk at the second hole in a sudden-death playoff. At the beginning of the week, Short had been fourth alternate to get into the field. Lingering back problems kept Short from competing for three years and he attempted to restart his PGA Tour career in 2013. Short made the cut at the 2013 Shell Houston Open, his first on the PGA since 2007. Short was unable to satisfy his medical extension, making five cuts in fifteen events.

Short earned medalist honors at the 2013 Champions Tour qualifying school. He earned his first Champions Tour win at the 2014 Quebec Championship.

In 2016, Short qualified for his first U.S. Open.

On September 1, 2019, Short won his second event on the PGA Tour Champions at the Shaw Charity Classic in Calgary, Alberta.

Professional wins (4)

PGA Tour wins (1)

PGA Tour playoff record (1–0)

Other wins (1)
1994 PGA Assistant Professional Championship

PGA Tour Champions wins (2)

PGA Tour Champions playoff record (0–1)

Results in major championships

CUT = missed the halfway cut
Note: Short never played in the Masters Tournament or The Open Championship.

Results in The Players Championship

CUT = missed the halfway cut

Results in World Golf Championships

"T" = Tied

See also
2003 PGA Tour Qualifying School graduates

References

External links

American male golfers
Texas Longhorns men's golfers
PGA Tour golfers
PGA Tour Champions golfers
Golfers from Austin, Texas
1963 births
Living people